Robin Lee Row (born September 12, 1957) is a death row inmate in Idaho, having been convicted of the murders of her husband and two children. The murders took place on February 10, 1992, when a fire broke out on the first floor of the apartment in which Row's husband, from whom she was separated, and her two children were living. When fire crews reached the scene of the burning structure, they found three bodies that were subsequently identified as her husband Randy and children Joshua, 10, and Tabitha, 8. All three had died due to carbon monoxide poisoning.

Investigation
Fire investigators concluded that a liquid accelerant was used to start the fire and, upon further investigation, that the smoke alarm had been turned off. Row had been living with friends and investigators had placed her as the main suspect. Current Ada County Sheriff Gary Raney was the chief investigator on the case. As he delved into the case, he saw many red flags that indicated that Robin Row was the main suspect. Further investigation concluded that in 1980, she and her son Keith were living in a cabin in California. Her son died in a fire that was caused by a portable heater that ignited his blankets. The boy died, and Row collected $28,000 from the life insurance policy.

Arrest and conviction
As the investigation progressed, Row was embezzling money from the YMCA where she worked. Detectives found that Row had taken out life insurance policies on her husband and children, totaling over a quarter of a million dollars. She was arrested and charged with three counts of first-degree murder. Her trial began in 1993, and on December 16, she was found guilty on each count.

Appeals
In 2011, her appeal was dismissed by Judge B. Lynn Winmill. She is the sole death row inmate in Pocatello Women's Correctional Center (PWCC) in Pocatello, Idaho.

See also
 List of death row inmates in the United States
 List of women on death row in the United States

References

Living people
Arson in Idaho
American murderers of children
American female murderers
American murderers
American female criminals
American arsonists
Women sentenced to death
Prisoners sentenced to death by Idaho
Place of birth missing (living people)
1957 births
1992 murders in the United States
People convicted of murder by Idaho
Criminals from Idaho
Murderers for life insurance money
Familicides
20th-century American criminals